The Funtastic World of Hanna-Barbera is an American animated syndicated programming block produced by Hanna-Barbera Productions that ran on a weekly schedule and was performed in live action. The program ran from 1985 to 1994.

Overview
The block premiered on Sunday, September 15, 1985, and included an array of both old and new Hanna-Barbera original cartoon shows. The show aired on Sundays in most markets, but some stations broadcast it on both weekdays and Saturdays. The 1985 to 1987 edition was hosted by legendary Hanna-Barbera mainstays, Yogi Bear, Quick Draw McGraw, Huckleberry Hound and Snagglepuss in their live action costumed forms (all voiced by Daws Butler).

Each show included HBTV segments featuring music videos of classic Hanna-Barbera cartoon clips (similar to Disney's D-TV and similar videos on MTV). It included hits like "Bad Moon Rising" by Creedence Clearwater Revival and "Somebody's Watching Me" by Rockwell. "It's Fun! Fun! Fun! Funtastic!", was the main theme song for the Funtastic World's first three seasons and also the theme for Yogi's newest series, Yogi's Treasure Hunt. Next, "The Down and Dirty Dinosaurs" from the game show Skedaddle hosted the 1988 edition, and then the 1990 edition was hosted by Kenny Ford and Jennifer Love Hewitt (while their show Kids Incorporated was off the air).

The shows featured in the animation block had a superstar lineup of both old and new H-B animated characters. The block ran from 1985 to 1994, initially as a -hour block featuring The Paw-Paws, Yogi's Treasure Hunt, and Galtar and the Golden Lance. However it became a mighty success and the block went to 2 hours in 1986. In the block's final year, two of its shows, SWAT Kats: The Radical Squadron and 2 Stupid Dogs, also aired on TBS Sunday mornings.

Distribution
It was originally distributed by Worldvision Enterprises, then moved to Turner Program Services after the sale of the Hanna-Barbera studio to Turner Broadcasting. Most of the shows that aired on the block are now distributed by Warner Bros. Television Distribution. When it first aired, The Funtastic World of Hanna-Barbera could be seen on all independent stations owned by Taft, the parent company of Hanna-Barbera Productions and Worldvision Enterprises at the time.

Stations
When The Funtastic World of Hanna-Barbera first launched on Sunday, September 15, 1985, it was also pre-sold to Taft Broadcasting, Tribune, Metromedia, Chris-Craft owned stations.

Shows
 The Adventures of Don Coyote and Sancho Panda (1990–93)
 Dastardly and Muttley in Their Flying Machines (1993–94)
 Fantastic Max (1988–92)
 The Flintstone Kids (1988)
 The Further Adventures of SuperTed (1989–90)
 Galtar and the Golden Lance (1985–87, 1988–89)
 HBTV (1985–87)
 The Jetsons (1993–94)
 Jonny Quest/The New Adventures of Jonny Quest (1986–89)
 Midnight Patrol: Adventures in the Dream Zone (1990–91)
 Paw Paws (1985–87)
 Paddington Bear (1989–90)
 The Pirates of Dark Water (1992–93)
 Richie Rich (1988–92)
 Skedaddle (1988)
 Sky Commanders (1987–88)
 Snorks (1987–88)
 SWAT Kats: The Radical Squadron (1993–94)
 2 Stupid Dogs (1993–94)
 Yogi's Treasure Hunt (1985–88)
 Yo Yogi! (1992–93)
 Young Robin Hood (1991–93)

References

External links
 
 HBTV at The Big Cartoon DataBase

 
American television shows featuring puppetry
Television programming blocks in the United States
Television syndication packages
Hanna-Barbera